CFR Turnu Severin is a football club based in Turnu Severin (now Drobeta-Turnu Severin), Romania. It was founded in 1928 and it won one Romanian Cup in 1943. The club was dissolved in 1958.

History

The railroad workers team from the Danube port of Porţile de Fier was founded in 1928, under president I. Tipărescu. The first antebellum appearance is recorded in 1939–40 (9th place in the Liga II). In 1940–41, it finishes first in the series and wins the right to promote to the Liga I, but the championship is interrupted because of the war. Players used in that period were: Robu, Negru, C. Ionescu, Pavel, Martin, Iaşinschi, Dumitrescu, Pârjol, Haţieganu, Mureşan, Ispas, Iliescu, Dobrescu, Jumanca, Szilárd, Cozma, Ludwig, Lupulescu, Felecan II, Biolan II, Nanu.

In the 1941–45 period it participates at the restrained	version of the national championship and has an outstanding performance in the Romanian Cup, winning the trophy at the end of the 1942–43 season. The team that succeeded this amazing performance was: Pavlovici – Oprean, Felecan III – Mureşan, Pârjol, Marcu – Vidan, Cozma, Ludwig, Felecan II, Reuter. Other players in the squad: Robu, Stoenescu, Ciobanu, Ispas, Kovács, Vlaicu, Jumanca, Martin, Stan, Tecău.

After World War II, the team reappears in the Liga II for three seasons (1946–49). Two seasons (1950 and 1951) then it activates in the regional championship. It succeeds to promote back to the Liga II in 1952 under the name of Locomotiva, but in 1956 relegation comes once again. In the 1957–58 season it comes back to the traditional name of CFR and plays in the Liga III. This was the last season in history for the club.

From now on the club enters a total anonymity, its place and role in the football of Turnu Severin being taken by the Naval Shipyard's team, FC Drobeta-Turnu Severin.

Honours

Liga II:
Winners (1): 1940–41

Romanian Cup:
Winners (1): 1942–43

Association football clubs established in 1928
Defunct football clubs in Romania
Liga II clubs
Liga III clubs
Mehedinți County
1928 establishments in Romania